Gary Myers Anderson (born April 7, 1969) is a former competition medley and backstroke swimmer from Canada, who competed for his native country at the 1988 Summer Olympics in Seoul, South Korea.

At Seoul, Anderson finished in 8th position in the 200-metre individual medley. Four years later at the 1992 Summer Olympics in Barcelona, Anderson claimed the same spot in the same event.

Anderson was the head coach for the California Aquatics swim team in Pasadena, Santa Clarita, and South Pasadena, California.

See also
 List of Commonwealth Games medallists in swimming (men)

References

1969 births
Living people
Canadian male backstroke swimmers
Canadian male medley swimmers
Olympic swimmers of Canada
Swimmers from Montreal
Swimmers at the 1988 Summer Olympics
Swimmers at the 1990 Commonwealth Games
Swimmers at the 1992 Summer Olympics
Swimmers at the 1994 Commonwealth Games
Swimmers at the 1995 Pan American Games
Commonwealth Games medallists in swimming
Commonwealth Games gold medallists for Canada
Commonwealth Games silver medallists for Canada
Anglophone Quebec people
Pan American Games competitors for Canada
Medallists at the 1990 Commonwealth Games